Ismayilli District is one of the 66 districts of Azerbaijan. It is located in the north of the country and belongs to the Mountainous Shirvan Economic Region. The district borders the districts of Qabala, Quba, Goychay, Kurdamir, Agsu, Shamakhi, and the Russian Republic of Dagestan. Its capital and largest city is Ismayilli. As of 2020, the district had a population of 87,400. It is believed that this district was named after a highly respected elder and philanthropist in the community, Ismayil Baghiyev.

History 

Ismayilli district was created with the centre in the Ismayilli village on November 21, 1931. Before the establishment of the district, one of its parts was in Goychay province, another one in Shamakhy province and the smallest part within Sheki province.

The territory, like all the northern lands of Azerbaijan, was part of the Albanian state in the 4th century B.C. Mehran Gyrdyman from the dynasty of Sasanies even created his own kingdom at the territory. Albanian rulers Varaz Grigor and his son Djavanshir (616-681) were also from the dynasty of Mihranids. The Gyrdyman state was ruled by the most prominent ruler of Albania Djavanshir in 638–670. The ruins of the residence built by him on the Aghchay river 4 km from Talystan village is still famous as the Djavanshir tower.

A number of settlements, especially Lahydj and Basgal settlements, Ivanovka, Galadjyg, Talystan and Diyarly villages are notable for their ancient history and special beauty. Lahij and Basgal were declared the reserves of history and culture.

Ismayilli district has a number of ancient historical monuments.

Significant measures are taken for the development of tourism.

The Ismayilli city had been a village until 1959, a settlement until 1967, and after that, it was transformed into a city.

Geography 

The district covers an area of 2074 km2. It borders Guba in the north, Shamakhy in the east, Aghsu in the southeast, Kurdemir in the south, Goychay in the southwest and Gabala in the west.

Ismayilli district includes one city, two settlements and 106 villages. These settlements are controlled by 34 territorial representations and 67 municipalities.

The landscape is mainly composed of mountains. Altitudes vary between 200 and 3629 meters (Babadagh) above sea level. The area is passed by the Goychay, Gyrdyman, Akhokh, Ayrichay, Sulut and other rivers, Yekekhana and Ashygbayram artificial ponds.

The district covers 2,158.75 km2 with 220.58 km2 of winter and 135.55 km2 of summer pastures. The lands used in agriculture account for 966.3 km2 including 36.263 km2 of fertile lands.

Woodlands account for 667.99 km2. The district accounts for the State Reserve of Ismayilli. Part of the district is included in the Shahdagh National Park. 

Ismailly district has a rich nature. The forests are composed of oak, hornbeam, beech-tree, alder-tree, birch-tree, poplar, pear, spoke and other trees. Such fauna as elk, mountain goat, chamois, deer, roe deer, bear, boar, lynx, fox, wolf, squirrel, coon, pheasant, partridge, eagle, falcon, tetra and others are found in the forests.

Demographics 
Its population was 86,100 persons on January 1, 2018. Azerbaijanis are majority. Tats, Armenians, Russians and Lezgians are other ethnic groups of Ismayilli District.

Population 
According to the Annual report of the State Statistics Committee, the total number of population in 2000 was 73,000. In 2018, this indicator increased by 13,100 people.

Language
 Azerbaijani
 Tati
 Lezgian
 Russian

Media

The sociopolitical newspaper Girdyman was established in 2002 and is issued twice or thrice a month in 500 editions. It was founded by the executive body of the district and the creative collective of the publishing house. It was registered by the Ministry of Justice of the Republic of Azerbaijan with registration number 120.

The publication of a local newspaper commenced in 1934. It was called Yeni Ismayilly from 1934 to 1966, Zehmetkesh from 1966 to 1991 and Djavanshir yurdu from 1991.

The radio station of the district was registered in the head department for mass media under the State Press Committee and started operating on February 10, 1993. It aims to provide the residents of Ismayilly with daily sociopolitical news, entertaining programs and programs for children, ads, announcements and other programs. It transmits its programs thirty minutes a day except for Saturday and Sunday.

It is the executive body of the district. It has previously operated as a ten-minute news bulletin in a local newspaper.

Notes

References 
 
The site about village Iwanowka (Russian)

 
Districts of Azerbaijan